The John Bowne House is a house in Flushing, Queens, New York City, that is known for its role in establishing religious tolerance in the United States.

Built around 1661, it was the location of a Quaker meeting in 1662 that resulted in the arrest of its owner, John Bowne, by Peter Stuyvesant, Dutch Director-General of New Netherland. Bowne successfully appealed his arrest to the Dutch West India Company and established a precedent for religious tolerance and freedom in the colony. His appeal helped to serve as the basis for the later guarantees of freedom of religion, speech and right of assembly in the Constitution.

Many of John Bowne's descendants engaged in abolitionist anti-slavery activism. For example, John's great-grandson Robert Bowne was an early founder with Alexander Hamilton and others of the Manumission Society of New York in 1784. Some of its residents such as Mary Bowne Parsons’ son William B. Parsons have also been documented as acting as conductors assisting fugitive slaves on the Underground Railroad prior to the American Civil War.

The home is a wood-frame Anglo-Dutch Colonial saltbox, notable for its steeply pitched roof with three dormers. The house was altered several times over the centuries, and several generations of the Bowne family lived in the house until 1945, when the family deeded the property to the Bowne Historical Society. The Bowne House became a museum in 1947. The exterior has since been renovated. Archaeological investigations have been conducted by Dr. James A. Moore of Queens College, City University of New York.

The building was listed on the National Register of Historic Places in 1977, and is also a New York City designated landmark.

See also
List of the oldest buildings in New York
Flushing Remonstrance
List of New York City Designated Landmarks in Queens
National Register of Historic Places listings in Queens

References

External links

Houses completed in 1661
Quaker meeting houses in New York City
Houses on the National Register of Historic Places in Queens, New York
Historic American Buildings Survey in New York (state)
Saltbox architecture in New York
New York City Designated Landmarks in Queens, New York
Houses on the Underground Railroad
Museums in Queens, New York
Historic house museums in New York City
Museums established in 1947
1947 establishments in New York City
Flushing, Queens
1661 establishments in the Dutch Empire
Underground Railroad in New York (state)
African-American history in New York City